Marc Würgler (born on 12 December 1977), better known by his stage name Remady, is a Swiss music producer from Zürich.

His beginnings was under the name Player & Remady also known as Remady P&R. He later started to simply be called "Remady", and it is under this name that he achieved his first commercially successful album, No Superstar (The Album) which featured the singles "Give Me a Sign" (which earned him an NRJ music award), "Save Your Heart", "No Superstar" and "Do It on My Own". 
He has collaborated extensively with "Manu-L", prior to forming the duo Remady & Manu-L.

Discography

Albums

Studio albums

Singles

References

1977 births
Living people
Musicians from Zürich
Swiss record producers